Dadyal is a tehsil in Mirpur district, located in Azad Jammu and Kashmir, Pakistan. It is home to roughly 84 villages.

Notable people
Chauhdry Abdul Rashid, Former Lord Mayor of Birmingham
Moeen Ali, English cricketer
Mohammed Ajeeb, Former Lord Mayor of Bradford
Javed Khan, Ex CEO Barnardos
Sameer Hussain, Founder of Dadyal Online (Dadyal.com)

See also
 Ramkot Fort

References

Tehsils of Mirpur District
Populated places in Mirpur District